David Coleman (1926–2013) was a British sports commentator.

David Coleman may also refer to:

 David Coleman (New Zealand politician) (1881–1951), politician of the Labour Party
 David Coleman (footballer, born 1942) (1942–2016), association footballer for Colchester United
 Dave Coleman (baseball coach) (born 1943), member of the Northeastern University athletics Hall of Fame
 David Firth Coleman (born 1945), British actor
 David Coleman (demographer) (born 1946), British professor of Demography at Oxford University
 Dave Coleman (outfielder) (born 1950)
 David Coleman (footballer, born 1967) (1967–1997), association footballer for Bournemouth and Colchester United
 David Coleman (educator) (born 1969), College Board president and architect of the Common Core State Standards Initiative
 David Robert Coleman (born 1969), conductor and composer
 David Coleman (Australian politician) (born 1974), federal Liberal Party politician
 David Coleman (architect) (fl. 2011), American architect

See also 
 David Colman (1949–2011), American neuroscientist